Marc Heitmeier (born 18 March 1985) is a German retired professional footballer who played as a midfielder.

References

External links
 
 

1985 births
Living people
German footballers
Association football midfielders
2. Bundesliga players
3. Liga players
Borussia Dortmund II players
SV Wilhelmshaven players
Kickers Offenbach players
FSV Frankfurt players
SC Preußen Münster players
Footballers from Dortmund